Michael Stöckigt (born 1957) is a German composer and pianist. His father is the East German pianist Siegfried Stöckigt. In 1973 Michael Stöckigt became a master student in composition of Günter Kochan at the Berlin College of Music "Hanns Eisler". He was awarded in Australia, Austria (International Composition Competition, 1981) and Italy. Today he is a docent in Berlin and at the University of Music and Theatre in Rostock. As a pianist he performed in France, Syria and the Netherlands. He composes for musicians such as the  Ensemble Sortisatio.

External links 
 https://web.archive.org/web/20110612095321/http://www.berlin.de/ba-neukoelln/presse/archiv/20081125.1015.115110.html

1957 births
20th-century classical composers
21st-century classical composers
German classical composers
German pianists
Mendelssohn Prize winners
Academic staff of the Hochschule für Musik Hanns Eisler Berlin
Living people
German male classical composers
20th-century German composers
21st-century German composers
German male pianists
21st-century classical pianists
20th-century German male musicians
21st-century German male musicians